Cromagnon was an American experimental music band that was active during the late 1960s. Led by multi-instrumentalist singer-songwriters Austin Grasmere and Brian Elliot, the band's only release was the album Orgasm in 1969, which was later reissued as Cave Rock. They are said to have foreshadowed the rise of noise rock, no wave, industrial and industrial rock. While the band was not commercially notable or successful, Pitchfork Media ranked their song "Caledonia", later covered by the Japanese experimental band Ghost, at number 163 on their list of "The 200 Greatest Songs of the 1960s". Treble includes "Caledonia" in "A History of Industrial Music in 45 Songs" 
 
Their album combined psychedelia, folk rock, sampling, sounds effect experimentation and noise with primitive instrumentation (including sticks and stones).

Discography
Orgasm (1969), later reissued as Cave Rock (2000)

References

American experimental musical groups
American experimental rock groups
ESP-Disk artists
Outsider musicians
Protopunk groups
Psychedelic rock music groups from New York (state)